Chakur is a town in Latur subdivision of Latur district in the Indian state of Maharashtra. It is also the headquarters for Chakur Taluka. The Town located on Maharashtra State Highway 3 (Kolhapur-Nanded-Nagpur National Highway NH 361). Former Home Minister of India Shivraj Patil is from Chakur. Chakrapuri is the old name of chakur city.

Demographics
In the 2001 Indian census Chakur had a population of 16,122 inhabitants.

References 
3.Shivraj Patil
4.Tanveer Shaikh Laturkar

Villages in Latur district
Latur district
Neighbourhoods in Latur
Talukas in Maharashtra